Jean-Pierre Weber (31 December 1899 – 15 March 1967) was a Luxembourgian footballer. He competed in the men's tournament at the 1924 Summer Olympics.

References

External links
 

1899 births
1967 deaths
Luxembourgian footballers
Luxembourg international footballers
Olympic footballers of Luxembourg
Footballers at the 1924 Summer Olympics
Sportspeople from Esch-sur-Alzette
Association football midfielders